The Legislative Council of Saint Helena has 15 members, 12 members elected for a four-year term by popular vote and three members ex officio (appointed by the Governor). Members of the Council are referred to as Councillors and sometimes use the suffix "MLC" (Member of the Legislative Council), while the council itself is often referred to as "LegCo" by islanders officials.

Election summary

The twelve elected members of the 2021-2025 Legislative Council are:
 Julie Thomas (888 votes)
 Andrew James Turner (834 votes) 
 Corinda Sebastiana Stuart Essex (827 votes)*
 Martin Dave Henry (750 votes)*
 Jeffrey Robert Ellick (688 votes) 
 Ronald Arthur Coleman (678 votes)
 Karl Gavin Thrower (611 votes)
 Gillian Ann Brooks (561 votes)
 Christine Scipio-O'Dean (533 votes)*
 Mark Alan Brooks (532 votes)
 Robert Charles Midwinter (485 votes) 
 Rosemary June Bargo (456 votes) 

 An asterisk (*) denotes a sitting incumbent MLC who was duly re-elected.

Electoral divisions
Saint Helena is divided into eight districts, each with a community centre. The districts also serve as statistical subdivisions and electoral areas. Currently, all twelve elected MLCs represent the entire island as a single constituency. Previously, there were two constituencies (electoral districts) – "the East" and "the West", and each constituency had six Elected Members. Prior to that there were eight constituencies. The four most populated districts (i.e., Half Tree Hollow, Jamestown, Longwood, and St Paul's) each sent two representatives to the Legislative Council. The remaining districts (i.e., Alarm Forest, Blue Hill, Levelwood, and Sandy Bay) sent one representative each.

Speakers of the Legislative Council
John Wainwright Newman (?–?)
Eric W. George (?–2008)
Margaret Anne Catherine Hopkins (2008–2013)
Eric Benjamin (2013–2021)
Cyril Gunnell (2021–present)

See also
Ascension Island Council
Tristan da Cunha Island Council

References

Saint Helena
Organisations based in Saint Helena
Politics of Saint Helena
Saint Helena
Saint Helena, Ascension and Tristan da Cunha law